Local elections were held in Batangas on May 9, 2016, as part of the 2016 general election. Voters will select candidates for all local positions: a town mayor, vice mayor and town councilors, as well as members of the Sangguniang Panlalawigan, the vice-governor, governor and for the six districts of Batangas.

Provincial elections
The candidates for governor and vice governor with the highest number of votes wins the seat; they are voted separately, therefore, they may be of different parties when elected. Incumbent Governor Vilma Santos-Recto and Vice Governor Mark Leviste is barred from seeking reelection since they are in their third term.

Governor
Incumbent Vilma Santos-Recto is barred to seek another term, she instead will run for Congress in the 6th District. Incumbent Vice Governor Mark Leviste is her party's nominee. His main opponents are AGAP Party- list Representative Nicanor Briones, former 3-termer Governor and former 3-termer 2nd District Representative Hermilando Mandanas, incumbent 4th District Representative Mark Llandro Mendoza and Marcos Mandanas, Sr.

Vice Governor
Incumbent Jose Antonio Leviste II is barred to seek reelection and is running for governor. His party nominated incumbent 4th District Board Member Amado Carlos Bolilia IV. His main opponents are former 3rd District Board Member Chona Dimayuga, Danilo Guste and former Calaca, Batangas Mayor Sofronio Ona Jr.

Congressional elections

1st District
Eileen Ermita-Buhain is the incumbent

2nd District
Raneo Abu is the incumbent

≥u

3rd District
Nelson Collantes is the incumbent. His opponent is DZJV reporter Nestor Burgos. On October 17, Burgos withdrew his candidacy, thus resulting to Collantes running unopposed. On December 10, Collantes also withdrew his candidacy to give way to his wife, Maria Theresa.

≥u

4th District
Incumbent Mark Llandro Mendoza is the last Representative of the 4th District of Batangas. Running for a seat are former Board Member Lianda Bolilia and incumbent Taysan Mayor Victor Portugal, Jr.

≥u

5th District (Batangas City)
Incumbent 2nd District Board Member Mario Vittorio Mariño will run for the newly created 5th District against Danilo Berberabe, Felipe Baroja, Carloto Bisa and former Justice Secretary Hernando Perez.

≥u

6th District (Lipa City)
Incumbent Mark Llandro Mendoza who came from the 4th District is term-limited and is running for Governor. Running for a seat in Congress is Bernadette Sabili, wife of Mayor Meynard Sabili and incumbent Governor Vilma Santos-Recto. Initially, Sabili is running under the National Unity Party. Like her husband, the party withdrew her nomination due to its coalition with the Liberal Party. As a result, Sabili is running as an independent.

≥u

Sangguniang Panlalawigan election
All six districts of Batangas will elect Sangguniang Panlalawigan or provincial board members.

1st District
Municipalities: Balayan, Calaca, Calatagan, Lemery, Lian, Nasugbu, Taal, Tuy
Population (2010): 546,811
Parties are as stated in their certificate of candidacies.

|-

|-
|colspan=5 bgcolor=black|

|-

|-

|-

|-

|-

2nd District
Municipalities: Bauan, Lobo, Mabini, San Luis, San Pascual, Tingloy
Population (2010): 269,981

|-

|-
|colspan=5 bgcolor=black|

|-

|-

|-

|-

|-

|-

|-

3rd District
City: Tanauan City
Municipalities: Agoncillo, Alitagtag, Balete, Cuenca, Laurel, Malvar, Mataas na Kahoy, San Nicolas, Santa Teresita, Santo Tomas, Talisay
Population (2010): 574,443

|-

|-
|colspan=5 bgcolor=black|

|-

|-

|-

4th District
Municipalities: Ibaan, Padre Garcia, Rosario, San Jose, San Juan, Taysan
Population (2010):  397,085

|-

|-
|colspan=5 bgcolor=black|

|-

|-

|-

|-

5th District
City: Batangas City
Population (2010):  305,607

|-

|-
|colspan=5 bgcolor=black|

|-

|-

|-

6th District
City: Lipa City 
Population (2010):  283,468

|-

|-
|colspan=5 bgcolor=black|

|-

|-

City and municipal elections
All municipalities of Batangas, Batangas City, Lipa City and Tanauan City will elect mayor and vice-mayor this election. The candidates for mayor and vice mayor with the highest number of votes wins the seat; they are voted separately, therefore, they may be of different parties when elected. Below is the list of mayoralty and vice-mayoralty candidates of each city and municipalities per district

1st District
Municipality: Balayan, Calaca, Calatagan, Lemery, Lian, Nasugbu, Taal, Tuy

Balayan
Incumbent Emmanuel Fronda is term-limited. His son, Emmanuel Salvador II is his party's nominee.

≥u

Incumbent Joel Arada is running for reelection.

≥u

Calaca
Incumbent Sofronio Manuel Ona is running for reelection.

≥u

Incumbent Renante Macalindong is running for reelection unopposed.

≥u

Calatagan
Incumbent Mayor Sophia Palacio is term limited and is running for Board Member. Her husband, former Mayor Peter Oliver Palacio is her party's nominee. His opponent is former Vice Mayor Lenie Pantoja

≥u

Incumbent Glen Aytona is running for reelection. His opponents are actress Andrea del Rosario and Michael Anzalado.

≥u

Lemery
Incumbent Charisma Alilio is not running. Her husband, former Mayor Eulalio Alilio is her party's nominee.

≥u

Incumbent Honorlito Solis is running for Mayor.

≥u

Lian
Incumbent Isagani Bolompo is running for reelection

≥u

Incumbent Braulio Lagrisola is running for reelection.

≥u

Nasugbu
Incumbent Rosario Apacible is running for reelection.

≥u

Incumbent Larry Albanio is running for reelection.

≥u

Taal
Incumbent Michael Montenegro is term limited. His party nominated incumbent Vice Mayor Fulgencio Mercado.

≥u

Incumbent Fulgencio Mercado is term limited and is running for Mayor.

≥u

Tuy
Incumbent Mayor Jose Jecerell Cerrado is running for reelection unopposed.

≥u

Incumbent Ritcher Rodriguez is running for reelection.

≥u

2nd District
Municipality: Bauan, Lobo, Mabini, San Luis, San Pascual, Tingloy

Bauan
Incumbent Ryanh Dolor is term limited. His father, former Mayor and Liga ng mga Barangay Provincial Federation President Herminigildo Dolor is running for mayor under United Nationalist Alliance. His opponents are Mario Bejer and Juan Magboo.

≥u

Incumbent Julian Casapao is running for reelection. His opponents are Presnedy Bacal, Romel Basilan and Gaudencio Masangcay.

≥u

Lobo
Incumbent Gaudioso Manalo is running for reelection. His opponent is former Mayor Efren Diona

≥u

Incumbent Renato Perez is running for reelection.

≥u

Mabini
Incumbent Nilo Villanueva is term limited. His party nominated incumbent Vice Mayor Elmar Panopio.

≥u

Incumbent Elmar Panopio is running for Mayor.

≥u

San Luis
Incumbent Samuel Noel Ocampo is running for a first full three-year term.

Incumbent Danilo Medina is running for a first full three-year term.

San Pascual
Incumbent Antonio Dimayuga is barred to seek another term, he instead will run for vice-mayor. Incumbent Vice Mayor Davis Fider is his party's nominee. His main opponent is Roanna Conti. It is her third time to run in mayoralty position.

Incumbent Davis Fider is barred to seek another term, he instead will run for mayor. Incumbent Mayor Antonio Dimayuga is his party's nominee. His main opponents are Claro Conti and Norman Dimatatac.

Tingloy
Incumbent Lauro Alvarez is term limited. His son, former SK Provincial Federation President Mark Lawrence Alvarez is his party's nominee.

Incumbent Danilo Datingaling is running for Councilor.

3rd District
City: Tanauan City
Municipality: Agoncillo, Alitagtag, Balete, Cuenca, Laurel, Malvar, Mataas na Kahoy, San Nicolas, Santa Teresita, Santo Tomas, Talisay

Tanauan City
Incumbent mayor Antonio "Thony" Halili is running for a second term under Tanauan City's Hope (TCH) Team which is affiliated with the Nationalist People's Coalition.  His opponent is retired Batangas provincial police director David Quimio.

Meanwhile, the local Liberal Party chapter will support Team TCH despite the latter's affiliation with NPC.

Incumbent Jhoanna Corona is running for re-election under the TCH Team. Her opponent is perennial council candidate Marcos Valdez Sr.

Agoncillo
Incumbent Danilo Reyes is running for reelection.

Incumbent Domingo Encarnacion is running for reelection.

Alitagtag
Incumbent Anthony Francis Andal is running for reelection.

Balete

Cuenca

Incumbent Rolando La Rosa is running for reelection.

Laurel
Incumbent Randy James Amo is running for reelection

Malvar
Incumbent Carlito Reyes is not running. His sister-in-law, incumbent Vice Mayor Cristeta Reyes is his party's nominee and is running unopposed.

Incumbent Cristeta Reyes is running for Mayor. His party nominated incumbent councilor Alberto Lat.

Mataasnakahoy
Incumbent Jay Ilagan is running for reelection. He initially won, however, the second placer, Gualberto Silva assumed the mayorship.

San Nicolas
Incumbent Epifanio Sandoval is term limited and is running for Vice Mayor

Incumbent Alfonso Biscocho is term limited

Santa Teresita
Incumbent Ma. Aurea Segunial is running for reelection.

Incumbent Carlos Bathan is running for reelection

Santo Tomas
Incumbent Edna Sanchez is running for reelection.

Incumbent Ferdinand Ramos is running for reelection.

Talisay
Talisay is the only municipality in the country where in the elections, the incumbent Mayor, Vice Mayor and all eight councilors are running without any opposing parties.

4th District
Municipality: Ibaan, Padre Garcia, Rosario, San Jose, San Juan, Taysan

Ibaan
Incumbent Mayor Juan Toreja is running for reelection.  His opponent is former mayor Remigio Hernandez.

Incumbent Sixto Yabyabin is running for reelection.

Padre Garcia
Incumbent Abraham Gutierrez is running for reelection.  His opponent is 1-CARE Party-list representative Michael Angelo Rivera.

Incumbent Noel Cantos is running for reelection.

Rosario
Incumbent Manuel Alvarez is running for reelection.

Incumbent Jose Valencia is not running.

San Jose
Incumbent Entiquio Briones is running for Vice Mayor.

Incumbent Valentino Patron is running for Mayor

San Juan
Incumbent Mayor Rodolfo Manalo is running for reelection. His opponents are former Mayor Danilo Mindanao and Nowell Ona.

Incumbent Octavio Antonio Marasigan is term limited. His party nominated incumbent Councilor Ildebrando Salud. His opponent is incumbent councilor Meynard Robles.

Taysan
Incumbent Victor Portugal, Jr. is term limited and is running for Congress. His brother, incumbent Councilor Joel Portugal is his party's nominee. His opponent is incumbent Vice Mayor Grande Gutierrez.

Incumbent Grande Gutierrez is term limited and is running for Mayor.

5th District
City: Batangas City

Batangas City

Incumbent Mayor Eduardo Dimacuha is running for reelection. His opponent is incumbent councilor Kristine Gonda Balmes, incidentally his former daughter-in-law. On December 10, Dimacuha withdrew his candidacy. His daughter Beverley Rose Dimacuha substituted him.

Incumbent Vice Mayor Emilio "Jun" Berberabe is running unopposed.  He is Balmes' running mate.

6th District
City: Lipa City

Lipa City

Incumbent Mayor Meynardo Sabili is running for reelection. His opponent is fiscal Edgardo Mendoza. Sabili is running under the National Unity Party, however the party withdrew Sabili's nomination thus, he is running as an independent.

Incumbent Eric Africa is running for reelection. His opponent is incumbent councilor Raul Montealto.

References

2016 Philippine local elections
Elections in Batangas
2016 elections in Calabarzon